Harry Macqueen is an English actor, writer and director. He trained at The Royal Central School of Speech and Drama in London.

Career 
His professional acting debut was in Richard Linklater's 2008 film, Me and Orson Welles playing 1930's Broadway star John Willard. Other credits include Jed Quinn in EastEnders, for BBC and Peter in the feature film Provenance, for which he won Best Supporting Actor at the 2017 Madrid Film Festival.

Hinterland was his debut feature film as a writer and director. It was nominated Best British Feature at Raindance Film Festival 2014 and in three categories including Best Debut Film at the Beijing International Film Festival 2015. Hinterland was the UK's first fully carbon-neutral feature film. 

His second feature as writer and director titled Supernova, starred Colin Firth and Stanley Tucci. It had its world premiere at San Sebastian Film Festival in 2020 and played as one of only 12 physical screenings at the 2020 London Film Festival. It was the opening film of The Dublin International Film Festival in 2021. 
The film was released by Studio Canal in the UK and Bleecker Street in the USA.

Supernova received rave reviews on its release. In the US it was 'Critic's Pick' in the New York Times with Glenn Kenny calling it 'spectacularly moving'. It received four stars out of four in The Washington Post. The LA Times' Justin Chang said the film "shouldn't be missed". It is 'Certified Fresh' on Rotten Tomatoes with a Tomatometer rating of 91%. The film was long-listed for three BAFTA Awards including Best British Film in 2021 and short-listed for Best Film at the European Film Award in the same year. In 2022 Supernova appeared on the 'Best British Films of the 21st Century' list - a poll by UK film critics.

Filmography

As actor

As filmmaker

References

1984 births
Living people
Place of birth missing (living people)
English male stage actors
English male film actors
English male television actors
English film directors
English screenwriters
English male screenwriters